A stealth startup is a type of startup company that operates in stealth and silence to outsiders, avoiding public attention. This may be done to hide information from competitors (which may include non-disclosure agreements), or as part of a marketing strategy to manage public image and generate expectations and interest from potential clients. A Stealth Startup normally only operates in stealth mode for its first few years.

The phenomenon is well known in the venture capital (VC) community. Since investors may have to disclose funding a stealth startup, their names are made public, but often only a general summary description is known about the company.

Advantages
 Protect new ideas and intellectual property: If a startup is working on a revolutionary product that would be easy to replicate, such as software ideas or relatively inexpensive new technology, operating as a stealth startup and not publicizing product details decreases the risk of the product being copied by other companies, as does having their employees execute NDAs. While this risk can be mitigated by patents, applying for a patent is a lengthy and expensive process, which is often not a viable option for a startup.
 Less pressure from the public: with only a close group of people privy to product details, employees can focus on building the prototype.

Disadvantages
Harder to build trust with potential investors and advisors: Without any news articles or public demos the startup will have to put more effort into convincing potential investors and advisors that the idea is being developed seriously already.
Finding new employees is more difficult: Without any track record in media and no ability to explain to candidates what they will be working on exactly, finding people willing to work for the company can be a challenge.
Harder to do public testing: Getting the product tested will have to be done under a different name, or with a small group having signed a non-disclosure agreement.

References

 

Entrepreneurship